is a Japanese former professional tennis player.

Maekawa reached a best singles ranking of 315 and won three titles on the ITF Circuit. As a doubles player, she featured in WTA Tour main draws, with her best performance a quarterfinal appearance at the 2010 Japan Open in Osaka.

ITF Circuit finals

Singles: 3 (3–0)

Doubles: 19 (8–11)

References

External links
 
 
 

1983 births
Living people
Japanese female tennis players
20th-century Japanese women
21st-century Japanese women